Broadcast Film Critics Association Awards 2001 may refer to:

 6th Critics' Choice Awards, the sixth Critics' Choice Awards ceremony that took place in 2001
 7th Critics' Choice Awards, the seventh Critics' Choice Awards ceremony that took place in 2002 and which honored the best in film for 2001